Ricker College was a small college located in Houlton, Maine, United States.

It began as Houlton Academy in 1848, before being subsequently renamed Ricker Classical Institute in 1887. It became Ricker Junior College in 1934 and operated as a four-year liberal arts college between that point and its closing in 1978.

The name "Ricker" was taken from Doctor Joseph Ricker, who was at the time the State Secretary of the Maine Baptist Convention.

As with many other small, private colleges in the US, Ricker College faced financial difficulties in the 1970s and was forced to close its Houlton campus in May 1978. Other off-campus programs in continuing education remained operational after the main campus's closing, but not at the collegiate level.

A branch of the University of Maine system, the University of Maine at Presque Isle Outreach at Houlton, holds classes in a newly renovated building on Military Street.

Notable alumni
 Bob Davoli, venture capitalist
 Paul Duffie, Canadian politician
 Ira G. Hersey, politician
 Henry L. Joy, politician
 David Parks, photographer
 Steve Shea, professional baseball player; pitcher with the Chicago Cubs, Houston Astros, and Montreal Expos
 Roger Sherman, politician
 Daniel Wathen, Chief Justice of the Maine Supreme Judicial Court
 Charles P. Pray, politician
 William E. Yerxa, educator and entrepreneur

Greek life

Fraternities
 Pi Lambda Phi, ME Kappa Beta
 Tau Epsilon Phi, Phi Delta Upsilon

References

External links
Ricker.net - (Defunct site) historical information website

Defunct private universities and colleges in Maine
Educational institutions established in 1848
Houlton, Maine
Universities and colleges in Aroostook County, Maine
University of Maine at Presque Isle
Educational institutions disestablished in 1978
1848 establishments in Maine
1978 disestablishments in Maine